Raffaella Manieri (born 26 November 1986) is an Italian footballer who plays as a defender for Serie A club Milan. She previously played for ACF Brescia Femminile, Torres CF, ACF Torino and ASD Bardolino in Italy, and Bayern Munich in Germany.

International career
Manieri is a member of the Italian national team. As an Under-19 international she scored against Nigeria in the 2004 U-19 World Championship, earning Italy its only point in the competition. In July 2007 she played her first match for the senior team against Mexico. She was included in the call-up for the 2009 European Championship as a reserve and subsequently consolidated herself in the team throughout the 2011 World Cup qualifying.

Honours and achievements

Club
Torres CF
Serie A: 2008, 2010, 2011
Italian Women's Cup: 2011

 Bayern München
 Bundesliga: 2014–15, 2015–16

References

1986 births
Living people
Italian women's footballers
Italy women's international footballers
Serie A (women's football) players
A.S.D. AGSM Verona F.C. players
Torres Calcio Femminile players
FC Bayern Munich (women) players
A.C.F. Brescia Calcio Femminile players
Italian expatriate women's footballers
Italian expatriate sportspeople in Germany
Expatriate women's footballers in Germany
People from Pesaro
Women's association football defenders
A.C. Milan Women players
Sportspeople from the Province of Pesaro and Urbino
Torino Women A.S.D. players
Footballers from Marche